Buildings and structures in the Comoros include:

St. Theresa of the Child Jesus Church, Moroni
Stade de Beaumer
Stade de Moroni
Stade Said Mohamed Cheikh

See also
List of airports in the Comoros
List of lighthouses in the Comoros
List of museums in the Comoros